Jazmín Ortenzi (born 20 November 2001) is an Argentine tennis player.

She has a career-high singles ranking of 406 by the Women's Tennis Association (WTA), achieved on 17 October 2022.

Ortenzi made her Fed Cup debut for Argentina in 2019.

ITF Circuit finals

Singles: 7 (5 titles, 2 runner–ups)

Doubles: 8 (5 titles, 3 runner–ups)

ITF Junior Circuit finals

Singles: 6 (6 titles)

Doubles: 6 (4 titles, 2 runner–ups)

National representation
Ortenzi made her Fed Cup debut for Argentina in 2019, while the team was competing in the Americas Zone Group I, when she was 17 years and 79 days old.

Fed Cup (3–3)

Singles (1–0)

Doubles (2–3)

References

External links
 
 
 

2001 births
Living people
Argentine female tennis players
21st-century Argentine women